Andrew Paul Sandoval (born January 5) is an American, best known as a Grammy Award nominated reissuer and compiler and engineer of historical albums, containing popular music from the rock era. Additionally, Sandoval has ongoing careers as author, DJ, journalist, songwriter and professional musician. Born in Santa Monica, California, his career in music began in 1986 as the editor and publisher of a fanzine called New Breed, a project that blossomed into work as a reissue director for such labels as Rhino and PolyGram. His writing has appeared in the form of liner notes to record and CD releases, as well as in articles featured in The Hollywood Reporter and Shindig!

Career
In December 1989, Sandoval performed his first live show as a solo musician and began professionally recording his music soon after (though his first record release did not appear until 1995). His last performances as a musician took place in Spain during a 2010 tour.

On September 11, 2006, Sandoval added DJ to his list of credits when he launched a weekly radio show called Come To The Sunshine on Luxuriamusic.com, which is broadcast live from Los Angeles every Monday from 3 to 5 p.m. (Pacific Time Zone).  A website chronicling the show was launched during the program's second series. On May 28, 2017, Come To The Sunshine moved from Luxuriamusic.com to WFMU's Rock & Soul Ichiban.

On December 1, 2010, Sandoval received his first Grammy nomination as a compiler and engineer for the Rhino release Where the Action Is! Los Angeles Nuggets 1965–1968.

Under the moniker Andrew, Sandoval has issued four albums (From Me to You, Happy to Be Here, What's It All About and A Beautiful Story) and two EPs (Happily Ever After and Million Dollar Movie). In 2006, Spanish label Hanky Panky issued a compilation of his recordings past and present titled  33: The Best of Andrew. His first officially released recording was featured on 1994's tribute compilation Sing Hollies in Reverse (which showcased various artists covering songs originally recorded by UK group The Hollies). Sandoval's songs have also been heard in the DVD versions of such television series as Dawson's Creek and Party Of Five.

The cast of musicians performing on Sandoval's albums include Ric Menck of Velvet Crush, David Nolte, Tom Dawes of The Cyrkle, Matt Cooker, Jim Laspesa, Carrie Bartsch, Kristian Hoffman, Dennis Diken of The Smithereens, Dave Amels, Probyn Gregory, Nelson Bragg, Steve Stanley, David Jenkins and Dan Schwartz. The producer/engineer of nearly all Sandoval's recordings is Brian Kehew.

Sandoval has also recorded and toured with Rock and Roll Hall of Fame inductee Dave Davies (of The Kinks). His work with Davies is included on the collections Unfinished Business, Rock Bottom, and  Kinked. Other artists that Sandoval has performed or recorded with include P.F. Sloan, Jackie DeShannon, Danny Hutton, Keith Allison, Kristian Hoffman, Dennis Diken with Bell Sound, Jigsaw Seen, The Wonderful World Of Joey, Patrick Campbell-Lyons and Abby Travis.

Reissue work 
As a reissue compiler, Sandoval has worked on releases by such artists as The Beach Boys, Bee Gees, The Kinks, The Monkees, The Band, Elvis Costello, Big Star, Chris Bell, Jan & Dean, The Cyrkle, Left Banke, Love, Pretty Things, Elton John, The Troggs, Wayne Fontana and The Mindbenders, P.F. Sloan, The Everly Brothers, Manfred Mann, Three Dog Night, The Zombies, Gene Clark, Tom Jones, The Grass Roots, Roger McGuinn, The Hollies, Blues Magoos, The Beau Brummels, Gary Lewis & The Playboys, Herman's Hermits, Dion DiMucci, The Turtles, Tommy James & The Shondells, Harry Nilsson and The Easybeats.

His compilations Come to the Sunshine: Soft Pop Nuggets from the WEA Vaults and Hallucinations: Psychedelic Pop Nuggets from the WEA Vaults were released by Rhino Handmade in 2004. A more extensive Nuggets collection compiled and annotated by Sandoval, Where the Action Is! Los Angeles Nuggets 1965–1968 (a 4-disc boxset), was released by Rhino on September 22, 2009. The set was nominated for a Grammy Award on December 1, 2010, as best historical album.

Author
Sandoval wrote the 2005 book The Monkees: The Day-by-Day Story of the 60s TV Pop Sensation. Mojo magazine said this work was, "...The only Monkees book you need…Essential reading and a poignant primer in how the template was set for today's shooting stars…as close as you'll get to the official word…an engaging document of one of the '60s most important phenomena.”

The book reached a notable milestone at 2:21:34 p.m. Eastern Daylight Time on Thursday, August 11, 2005, when Anne Slane, a cataloguer at Worthington (Ohio) Libraries for 23 years, entered the book as the 1 billionth holding in WorldCat, the world's richest online resource for finding library materials.

His second official book, The Bee Gees Day-By-Day Story: 1945–1972 was published in June 2012.

References

External links
 
 Andrew Sandoval web page

American radio DJs
Songwriters from California
Living people
Year of birth missing (living people)
American audio engineers
American multi-instrumentalists
American male pop singers
Mastering engineers
American writers
American male songwriters